Fayetteville is a village located in Onondaga County, New York, United States. As of the 2020 U.S. Census, the village had a population of 4,225. The village is named after the Marquis de Lafayette, a national hero of both France and the United States. It is part of the Syracuse Metropolitan Statistical Area.

Fayetteville is located in the town of Manlius and is an eastern suburb of the city of Syracuse.

History
The Charles Estabrook Mansion, Genesee Street Hill-Limestone Plaza Historic District, and Levi Snell House are listed on the National Register of Historic Places.

Geography
Fayetteville is in Central New York, at the intersection of New York State Route 5 and Route 257, at  (43.028516, -76.004268).

Demographics

As of the census of 2010, there were 4,373 people, 1,912 households, and 1,202 families living in the village.

Education
Public K–12 education is served by the Fayetteville-Manlius Central School District. Schools situated within the village include Fayetteville Elementary School and Wellwood Middle School. Wellwood Middle School has undergone a major renovation, part of a $45.2 million district capital project approved in December 2017 that includes a 15,000 square foot addition with a new main entrance, cafeteria, music rooms, art rooms, and classrooms as well as adding air conditioning and replacing windows. High school students attend Fayetteville–Manlius High School in Manlius, New York.

In 2009, the Fayetteville Free Library was rated a 5-star public library by Library Journal. The Fayetteville Library provides many useful resources such as quiet areas, computer labs, and a snack bar for all ages to utilize and enjoy.

President Grover Cleveland received his elementary education at the Fayetteville Academy.

Notable people
 Buddy Boeheim, professional basketball player for the Detroit Pistons
 Grover Cleveland, served as the 22nd and 24th president of the United States 
 Rose Cleveland, served as first lady of the United States from 1885 to 1886
 Matilda Joslyn Gage, activist known for her contributions to women's suffrage and  abolitionism
 Edward A. Hanna, served as mayor of Utica, New York from 1974 to 1978 and from 1996 to 2000
 Steven Page, musician, singer, songwriter, and record producer; founding member of Barenaked Ladies
 Caroline Pratt, social thinker and progressive educational reformer 
 Ashley Twichell, swimmer who competed at the 2020 Summer Olympics

See also
 Limestone Creek

References

External links

  Village of Fayetteville official website
  Town Info
 Fayetteville Free Library Web site
 Fayetteville Free Library's historic collections on New York Heritage Digital Collections
  Registry of former residents (Post WWII era) 

Villages in New York (state)
Syracuse metropolitan area
Villages in Onondaga County, New York
Manlius, New York